Eternal Now is an album by trumpeter Don Cherry recorded in 1973 and released on the Swedish Sonet label.

The album was reissued by Sonet on CD in 1996, paired with Live Ankara, with the title The Sonet Recordings.

Reception

The AllMusic review by Steve Huey awarded the album 4 stars stating "the whole point is to explore new musical possibilities and commonalities among cultures. While the results do meander occasionally, Eternal Now on the whole remains a fresh, unpredictable listen."

The authors of The Penguin Guide to Jazz Recordings wrote: "Aficionados of the Scandinavian scene will cherish a track featuring the great tenorist Bernt Rosengren on tarogato... 'Love Train' is perhaps the most jazz-based piece on the session. The remaining tracks are squarely in the world music idiom that Cherry was to make his own in years to come."

Track listing
All composions by Don Cherry except as indicated
 "Gamla Stan - The Old Town by Night" - 8:27 
 "Love Train" - 7:50 
 "Bass Figure for Ballatune" (Chris Bothen) - 3:44 
 "Moving Pictures for the Ear" (Bothen, Cherry) - 9:40 
 "Tibet" - 7:59 
Recorded at Studio Decibel in Stockholm, Sweden on April 30 (tracks 2-4) and May 1 (tracks 1 & 5), 1973.

Personnel
Don Cherry - trumpet, piano, harmonium, vocals, h'suan, daster, gong
Bengt Berger - piano, Tibetan bells, African finger piano, mridangam, cymbal
Christer Bothén - piano, Tibetan bells
Bernt Rosengren - tárogató
Agneta Ernström - Tibetan bells,

References

Sonet Records albums
Don Cherry (trumpeter) albums
1974 albums